Vale de Caveiros is the port of the island of Fogo, Cape Verde. It is situated 3 km north of the city of São Filipe. The port is managed by the national port authority ENAPOR. The port was reconstructed and expanded in 2013.

See also
List of ports in Cape Verde

References

Geography of Fogo, Cape Verde
São Filipe, Cape Verde
Valleys of Cape Verde
Ports and harbours of Cape Verde
Economy of Cape Verde